The North Bismarck Plate is a small tectonic plate located in the Bismarck Sea off the northeast coast of New Guinea.

Tectonics
To the north it collides with the Pacific Plate and the Caroline Plate, part of the western part subducts under the Woodlark Plate of New Guinea, and it is separated from the South Bismarck Plate by a divergent boundary called Bismarck Seismic Sea Lineation (BSSL).  The plate is moving easterly along with the Pacific plate.  It is in a very seismically active area.   Between the plate and the Caroline Plate is the Manus Trench and between the plate and the Pacific plate is the Kilinailai Trench.

See also
List of earthquakes in Papua New Guinea

References

Tectonic plates
Geology of the Pacific Ocean